Donald Campbell (18 September 1851 – 14 September 1887) was an Australian first-class cricketer. He played 25 matches for Victoria and Oxford University between 1869 and 1881.

Campbell was born at Loddon Plains in Victoria in 1851. He was educated at Christ Church, Oxford.

He died at South Yarra in Melbourne in 1887 aged 35.

References

External links

1851 births
1887 deaths
Australian cricketers
Victoria cricketers
Oxford University cricketers
Cricketers from Melbourne
Alumni of Christ Church, Oxford